This is a list of characters/actors featured in the S4C/BBC soap opera Pobol y Cwm.

Present characters
This includes characters who have been in the habit of returning after a long absence.

Past characters

Notes

Lists of British television series characters